The FIM Tobet Speedway World Cup – Event 2 was the second meeting of the 2009 Speedway World Cup tournament. It took place on 13 July 2009 in the East of England Showground in Peterborough, Great Britain.

The meeting was won by the Polish team and they qualified directly for the World Cup Final in Leszno, Poland. Australia and host team Great Britain qualified for the Race-Off. The last placed team, Slovenia, were knocked out of the competition.

Results 

As a Teams Declared was two changes. Pole Sebastian Ułamek (who broke a shoulder blade riding in the Swedish Elitserien) was replaced by Krzysztof Kasprzak. Polish manager Marek Cieślak said: I watched the Polish Championship semi-final where Krzysztof scored 13 points. He also had a very good performance in the Polish Ekstraliga before that. Injured was Australian Rory Schlein, who broke a collarbone and wrist in the British Elite League. Teenage Darcy Ward was an option, but he was injured also. Schlein will be replaced by Davey Watt.

It will be a SWC debut for five riders: two the British Lewis Bridger and Daniel King, one Pole Adrian Miedziński and two Slovenian riders Aleksander Čonda and Maks Gregorič.

Heat details

Heat after heat 
 Žagar, Gollob, Sullivan, Kennett
 Watt, Kasprzak, Bridger, Štojs
 Adams, Harris, Protasiewicz, Šantej
 Miedziński, Holder, Woffinden, Gregorič
 Hampel, Crump, King, Čonda
 King, Sullivan, Miedziński, Šantej
 Hampel, Watt, Kennett, Gregorič
 Adams, Bridger, Gollob, Čonda
 Holder, Žagar, Kasprzak, Harris
 Crump, Protasiewicz, Woffinden, Štojs
 Protasiewicz, Bridger, Sullivan, Gregorič
 Harris (6 pts), Miedziński, Watt, Čonda Harris as Joker.
 Hampel, Adams, Woffinden, Žagar (M) Žagar excluded - delayed the start.
 Gollob, King, Holder, Štojs
 Crump, Kasprzak, Kennett, Šantej
 Sullivan, Hampel, Harris, Čonda
 Gollob, Watt, Woffinden, Žagar (0 pts) Žagar as Joker.
 Kasprzak, King, Adams, Gregorič
 Protasiewicz, Holder, King, Čonda
 Crump, Zagar, Miedziński, Bridger
 Kasprzak, Čonda, Woffinden, Sullivan
 Zagar, Watt, Protasiewicz, King (E/start)
 Miedziński, Adams, Kennett, Štojs
 Hampel, Holder, Bridger, Šantej
 Crump, Harris, Gregorič, Gollob (M) Gollob excluded due to delaying the start.

See also 
 2009 Speedway World Cup
 motorcycle speedway

References 

E2